John Todd Purves is an American basketball coach.

Career 
He worked in Asian leagues, including the Indonesia Warriors for the ABL in 2011, and won a championship for the team.

He served as active team consultant replacing Rajko Toroman for Petron Blaze Boosters from 2013. As team consultant, he helped his team to reach 2013 PBA Governors' Cup Finals, but lost to eventual champion, San Mig Coffee Mixers. His role as an active consultant ended when Leo Austria was hired as head coach.

He returned to Indonesia in 2017 and served for the Satria Muda Pertamina Jakarta of the Indonesian Basketball League and won a championship for the team, but left after 2018.

He returned to the ABL and became the head coach of Macau Wolf Warriors.

References 

Living people
Year of birth missing (living people)